Donald Edwin Voorhees (September 8, 1930 – May 16, 2001) was an American politician in the state of Iowa.

Voorhees was born in Winfield, Kansas. He attended St. Johns College in Winfield, Kansas and was a medical representative. He served in the Iowa House of Representatives from 1967 to 1971 as a Republican. He died in 2001.

In August 1967, his 15-year-old son Donald E. Voorhees, Jr. was sexually abused by the future serial killer John Wayne Gacy, who was, like Don Sr., a member of the local Jaycees. Several months later, Don Jr. told his father about the attack; Don Sr. reported it to local police. Gacy was charged with sodomy; a few months later, he pleaded guilty and was sentenced to 10 years in prison. The fact that Gacy had a prior record of sexual assault helped 
police in Des Plaines, Illinois quickly focus on him as the lead suspect in the disappearance of Robert Piest in 1978.  The Des Plaines investigation into the Piest case led directly to the revelations of Gacy's 33 known murders.

References

1930 births
2001 deaths
People from Winfield, Kansas
Farmers from Iowa
Republican Party members of the Iowa House of Representatives
20th-century American politicians